Peperomia obtusifolia, also known as the baby rubberplant, American rubber plant, or  pepper face, is a species of flowering plant in the genus Peperomia under the family Piperaceae, native to Florida, Mexico and the Caribbean. The specific epithet obtusifolia means "blunt-leaved". The plant has gained the Royal Horticultural Society's Award of Garden Merit.

Description

P. obtusifolia is often confused with Peperomia magnoliifolia, and some earlier botanists considered these two names merely synonyms for the same species. As dried specimens, the plants can look highly similar, though the difference can be seen more easily with living plants: P. obtusifolia leaves are waxy, while P. mangoliifolia leaves are considered fleshy. Due to the confusion, plants in collections or on sale may be falsely labelled.

Cultivation
Although it needs high humidity, it does not require much care. Good lighting is enough to maintain the bright and intense colour of the leaves, though direct light causes discoloration. The stem is fleshy, so the plant does not need abundant or frequent watering. A popular houseplant, numerous cultivars have been developed, some of which show leaf variegation.

Pests and diseases
In general, the baby rubberplant is a resistant plant, though it can have problems with aphids and mealybugs. As with most houseplants, excessive watering can cause root rot.

Gallery

References

Flora of Florida
Flora of North America
Flora of Mexico
Flora of the Caribbean
House plants
obtusifolia
Flora without expected TNC conservation status